Sars-la-Buissière is a village of Wallonia and a district in the municipality of Lobbes, located in the province of Hainaut, Belgium.

History

The village was the site of the discovery of the bodies of three murder victims killed by notorious Belgian serial killer Marc Dutroux.

Notes

References

Former municipalities of Hainaut (province)